The Leningrad City Committee of the Communist Party of the Soviet Union, commonly referred to as the Leningrad CPSU gorkom, was the position of highest authority in the city of Leningrad (until January 26, 1924 Petrograd) roughly equating to that of mayor. The position was created in March 1918, and abolished on August 24, 1991. The First Secretary was a de facto appointed position usually by the Politburo or the General Secretary himself. Until the abolition of the CPSU monopoly on power on March 14, 1990, he had actual power in Leningrad.

First Secretaries

See also
Governor of Saint Petersburg
Leningrad Regional Committee of the Communist Party of the Soviet Union

Sources
 World Statesmen.org

Politics of Saint Petersburg
City Committees of the Communist Party of the Soviet Union
1918 establishments in Russia
1991 disestablishments in the Soviet Union